is a Japanese professional shogi player, ranked 7-dan.

Early life
Atsushi Miyata was born in Yoshikawa, Saitama on June 5, 1981. Up until around the age of eight years old, he spent his time playing Japanese youth baseball, but a leg injury meant that he could not participate in practices. Unable to practice, Miyata started spending time at the local library where he found some beginners books on shogi and learned how to play the game.

In 1992, Miyata was accepted into the Japan Shogi Association's apprentice school at the rank of 6-kyū under the guidance of shogi professional Kazuharu Shoshi. He was promoted to 1-dan in January 1996, and then obtained full professional status and the rank of 4-dan in October 2001 after winning the 29th 3-dan League (April 2001September 2001) with a record of 15 wins and 3 losses.

Shogi professional

Promotion history
The promotion history for Miyata is as follows:
 6-kyū: 1992
 1-dan: 1996
 4-dan: October 1, 2001
 5-dan: April 1, 2004
 6-dan: September 3, 2010
 7-dan: May 25, 2018

Awards and honors
Miyata received the Japan Shogi Association's 36th Annual Shogi Award (April 2008March 2009) for "Best Winning Percentage".

Tsume Shogi Solving Competition
Miyata is a six-time winner of the Tsume Shogi Solving Competition. He won the competition five out of the first six years it was held (20046, 20089), and his sixth victory came in 2013 when he won the 10th edition of the competition.

Notes

References

External links
ShogiHub: Professional Player Info · Miyata, Atsushi

Japanese shogi players
Living people
Professional shogi players
Professional shogi players from Saitama Prefecture
1981 births